NBA is a series of six basketball video games developed by San Diego Studio and published by Sony Computer Entertainment. The games are licensed by the National Basketball Association (NBA), and are one of several different NBA-focused basketball video game series. The games released in the series are NBA, NBA '06, NBA '07, NBA '08, NBA 09: The Inside, and NBA 10: The Inside. It is the successor to the NBA ShootOut series.

Games

NBA (2005)
NBA is a basketball video game which was released in March 2005 for the PSP.

NBA 06
NBA 06: Featuring the Life Vol. 1 was released on October 4, 2005 for the PSP and November 1, 2005 on PlayStation 2. The product features Phoenix Suns power forward/center Amar'e Stoudemire on the cover. You may also compete in a new feature the PlayStation's Skills challenge. Not in any other NBA games.

Amar'e Stoudemire and P.J. Carlesimo appeared in commercials featuring three fictitious NBA players.

NBA 07
NBA 07 was released in 2006. The product features Los Angeles Lakers guard Kobe Bryant on the cover, with his newly chosen jersey number of 24. It is the second installment of the NBA: Featuring the Life series by Sony Computer Entertainment, and is a launch game for the PlayStation 3 format.

NBA 08
NBA 08 was developed by San Diego Studio and published by Sony Computer Entertainment in 2007. For the second time in the series, Phoenix Suns F/C Amar'e Stoudemire is featured on the cover—Stoudemire appeared on the cover of NBA '06: featuring the Life Vol. 1 two years before. Unlike most NBA games, this one had a story.

NBA 09: The Inside
NBA 09: The Inside was developed by San Diego Studio and published by Sony Computer Entertainment on October 7, 2008. It does not feature a single cover athlete but instead features a group of six NBA players that include Carmelo Anthony, Carlos Boozer, Kobe Bryant, LeBron James, Paul Pierce, and Dwyane Wade.

NBA 10: The Inside

NBA 10: The Inside is a basketball simulation game developed by San Diego Studio and published by Sony Computer Entertainment for PSP on October 6, 2009.

Reception

The game received "average" reviews according to Metacritic.

References

External links

2009 video games
PlayStation Portable games
National Basketball Association video games
Sony Interactive Entertainment franchises
Sony Interactive Entertainment games
Video game franchises
Video game franchises introduced in 2005
Video games developed in the United States